Carry van Bruggen (1 January 1881 – 16 November 1932) was a Dutch writer. She also wrote under the name Justine Abbing.

Biography
One of 16 children of Izak de Haan and Betje Rubens, she was born Caroline Lea de Haan in Smilde and grew up in Zaandam, later studying to become a teacher. Her family was Orthodox Jewish, which she found stifling. She was the sister of writer Jacob Israël de Haan. She married , a socialist author, in 1904. She went with her husband to the Dutch East Indies and began writing for the newspapers there. They returned to Amsterdam in 1907 where van Bruggen continued writing for various publications. The couple divorced in 1917; she moved to Laren. In 1920, she married the art historian Adriaan Pit, who was more than twenty years her senior. This was a happier marriage but, after 1928, she frequently had depression and spent time in psychiatric hospitals.

Although supportive of feminist issues, she was skeptical of the feminist movements of her time. Similarly, she had an uneasy relationship with the literary establishment, developing her own writing style and stepping outside of prevailing literary traditions; however her quality already 1928 recognized by the important younger critic Menno Ter Braak.  Her contribution to the development of Dutch literature was only truly acknowledged after her death.

Van Bruggen died in Laren at the age of 51 from an overdose of sleeping pills.

Selected works 
 De verlatene (The abandoned), novel (1910)
 Heleen, novel (1913)
 Een coquette vrouw (A coquette), novel (1915)
 Prometheus, philosophic essay (1919)
 Uit het leven van een denkende vrouw (From the life of a thinking woman), novel (1920)
 Het huisje aan de sloot (The small house by the ditch), collection of short stories (1921)
 Avontuurtjes (Adventures), novel (1922)
 Vier jaargetijden (Four seasons), novel (1924)
 Hedendaags fetischisme (Contemporary fetishism), commentary (1925)
 Eva, novel (1927)

References 

Further Readings
 Augustinus P. Dierick: “The Discovery of the External World in the Short Stories of Carry van Bruggen (1881-1932).” Contemporary Explorations in the Culture of the Low Countries. Ed. William Z. Shetter & Inge Van der Cruysse. Lanham, New York, London: University Press of America, 1996.

External links

1881 births
1932 deaths
20th-century Dutch novelists
20th-century women writers
20th-century Dutch journalists
20th-century Dutch women
20th-century pseudonymous writers
Dutch Jews

People from Midden-Drenthe
People from Zaanstad
Dutch women novelists
Pseudonymous women writers